The Gozo Nature Museum, formerly known as the Natural Science Museum, is a museum in Victoria, on the island of Gozo, Malta. It has been open to public since 1991. It is housed in a group of houses within the Cittadella, the oldest part of the city. These houses date back to various ages: the older one, which was an inn, to 1495; the other to the 17th century.

The Natural Science Museum shows collections "relating to the Island’s geology, minerals, marine life, insects, local habitats and ecosystems" as well as national plants (including the Maltese Rock Centaury), human and animal evolution.
During later years, this building was used as an inn for visitors, and is mentioned in Thomas McGill’s “Handbook, or Guide, for Strangers visiting Malta” of 1839, and described as an excellent house of entertainment offering clean and comfortable beds and reasonably-priced dinners.
During World War II the building served as a shelter for families who sought refuge during aerial bombings.

The buildings which house the museum are listed on the National Inventory of the Cultural Property of the Maltese Islands.

See also
 List of museums in Malta

References

External links
 Official website
 museum on Official Malta Tourism website

Natural history museums
Museums in Malta
Victoria, Gozo
National Inventory of the Cultural Property of the Maltese Islands
Sites managed by Heritage Malta